Doğukan Nelik (born 5 December 2000) is a Turkish professional footballer who plays as a centre-back for TFF Second League club Nazilli Belediyespor, on loan from Antalyaspor.

Career
Nelik is a youth product of Akhisarspor, and made his professional debut with them in a 0–0 Süper Lig tie with Konyaspor on 25 May 2019. He transferred to Antalyaspor in July 2021, but shortly after ruptured his anterior cruciate ligament during practice, keeping him away from the pitch for 6–8 months.

In June 2021, Nelik signed a five-year contract with Antalyaspor. He was sent on a one-season loan to third-tier TFF Second League club Nazilli Belediyespor in August 2022.

References

External links
 Antalyaspor profile
 

2000 births
Living people
Sportspeople from Manisa
Turkish footballers
Antalyaspor footballers
Akhisarspor footballers
Nazilli Belediyespor footballers
Süper Lig players
TFF First League players
TFF Second League players
Association football defenders